North Whale Seaplane Base  is a state owned, public use seaplane base located in North Whale Pass, a community in the Prince of Wales-Hyder Census Area of the U.S. state of Alaska. It is included in the National Plan of Integrated Airport Systems for 2011–2015, which categorized it as a general aviation facility.

Facilities and aircraft
North Whale Seaplane Base has one seaplane landing area designated NW/SE with a water surface measuring 10,000 by 1,000 feet (3,048 x 305 m). For the 12-month period ending December 31, 2006, the airport had 350 aircraft operations, an average of 29 per month: 86% air taxi and 14% general aviation.

Airlines and destinations

References

External links
 Topographic map from USGS The National Map

Airports in the Prince of Wales–Hyder Census Area, Alaska
Seaplane bases in Alaska